Usta or Usteåne is a river located in the municipality of  Hol in Buskerud, Norway. It flows from Lake Ustevatn traveling northeast down the valley of Ustedalen to its confluence with Holselva. The ski resort at Geilo is situated just north of the river, about halfway down Ustedalen valley.

In 1965 almost all the waters of the Usta was diverted due to the construction of Usta Hydroelectric Power Station (Usta kraftverk). The power plant is owned and operated by E-CO Energi. The total average annual production at the plant is 780 GWh. Today the lower river is mostly a dry riverbed.

References

Rivers of Viken
Rivers of Norway